Deanna Helen Reder is a Cree-Métis associate professor of English and the Chair of Indigenous Studies at Simon Fraser University. Reder was elected a member of the College of New Scholars of the Royal Society of Canada in 2018. As a faculty member at Simon Fraser University, she was a founding member of the Indigenous Literary Studies Association (ILSA) and served on the council from 2015 to 2018. In 2019 she helped establish the Indigenous Editors Association (IEA) and served as its "Past-President" from 2020 to 2021.

Early life and education
While Reder has family all over the Canadian prairies, her Cree speaking Cree and Métis family come from La Ronge, and historically from Île-à-la-Crosse and surrounding communities, including Lac Doré, Green Lake, and Sled Lake Saskatchewan.  Her father was a corporal in the Canadian Armed Forces and the family lived on army bases until Reder was ten years old. Her parents did not graduate high school.

Reder says she began to understand the significance of autobiography when her mother read "Halfbreed" by Maria Campbell, and was excited to read a book that accurately represented her life. Growing up, Reder says that little Indigenous literature was taught in the school system, so that the only Indigenous author that she was assigned to read throughout her entire K-12 education was Pauline Johnson's poem "The Song my Paddle Sings."

While attending York University for her Masters of Arts, Reder wanted to focus on Indigenous literatures but found it difficult to find enough courses on the topic. She instead focused on nineteenth-century Canadian literature, noting that the focus was on settlers rather than Indigenous authors. After earning her MA, Reder took a break from her studies, returning in 2001 to begin her PhD.

Career
In 2007, Reder was hired as an assistant professor in the Department of English and the First Nations Studies Program at Simon Fraser University.

In 2010, Reder published "Troubling Tricksters: Revisioning Critical Conversations" with Linda M. Morra through Wilfrid Laurier University Press. Troubling Tricksters was an anthology of essays revolving around the trickster discourse in Indigenous literature.

In 2012, the First Nations Program at SFU was established as the Department of First Nations Studies at SFU. (In 2019 the department changed its name to The Department of Indigenous Studies.)The new department, which became effective in April 2012, included certificates in First Nations studies research and major, minor, and joint major with archaeology and linguistics. The following year, Reder was part of a council of Indigenous and settler scholars that founded the Indigenous Literary Studies Association (ILSA). As president of ILSA, she coordinated with Sam McKegney at Queen's, and with Sophie McCall at SFU and various other ILSA members, to organize the Indigenous Voices Awards in order to recognize emerging Indigenous authors in Canada.

In 2015, she became a Co-Investigator with Daniel Heath Justice and Margery Fee on a SSHRC-funded project called The People And The Text. The project aimed to collect literature by Indigenous authors that either never were published or had fallen out of print. Two years later, Reder edited Read, Listen, Tell: Indigenous Stories from Turtle Island with Sophie McCall, David Gaertner, and Gabrielle L'Hirondelle Hill.

In 2018, Reder and Alix Shield published documents that had been omitted from "Halfbreed" in 1973, against the wishes of author Maria Campbell, by the book's editors, at the last moment before publication. The documents were Campbell's account of being raped by Royal Canadian Mounted Police officers as a youth. She was also elected a member of the College of New Scholars of the Royal Society of Canada.

She sits on the Board of Directors of the non-profit Federation for the Humanities and Social Sciences. In June 2019, Reder was part of the SFU Art Cluster that elected to remove a piece of art that misrepresented Aboriginal people as passive and accepting of the colonization of British Columbia.

Publications
Troubling Tricksters: Revisioning Critical Conversations (2010), edited with Linda M. Morra
Learn, Teach, Challenge: Approaching Indigenous Literatures (2016), edited with Linda M. Morra
 Read, Listen, Tell: Indigenous Stories from Turtle Island (2017), Edited with Lead Editor Sophie McCall, as well as David Gaertner and Gabrielle L'hirondelle Hill
Honouring the Strength of Indian women: Plays, Stories, Poetry (2019), Edited with Michelle Coupal, Joanne Arnott, and Emalene A. Manuel

References 

Living people
Year of birth missing (living people)
York University alumni
Concordia University alumni
University of British Columbia alumni
Academic staff of Simon Fraser University
21st-century Canadian non-fiction writers
Canadian women non-fiction writers
21st-century Canadian women writers
Canadian women academics
First Nations women writers
Canadian Métis people
Canadian indigenous women academics
First Nations academics